The FIL European Luge Championships 1975 took place in Olang, Italy.

Men's singles

Women's singles

Men's doubles

Medal table

References
Men's doubles European champions
Men's singles European champions
Women's singles European champions

FIL European Luge Championships
1975 in luge
Luge in Italy
1975 in Italian sport